The NWA New England X Division Championship was the primary professional wrestling "X Division" title in the Century Wrestling Alliance. It was one of the later titles introduced to NWA New England after joining the National Wrestling Alliance in January 1998. It was originally won by Cameron Matthews after defeating Shawn Styles, Gina Marie and Psycho in a three-way match in Sanford, Maine on June 19, 2004. The title was defended only a short time, mostly in Sanford but also in other parts of New England, until Jason Rumble won the X Division and Cruiserweight titles in a five-way match at the 2006 Tony Rumble Memorial Show on November 25, 2006, and remained inactive until the CWA withdrew from the NWA on March 10, 2007.

Title history
Silver areas in the history indicate periods of unknown lineage.

References

National Wrestling Alliance championships
X Division championships
United States regional professional wrestling championships